General line may have the following meanings:

General line of the party
The General Line, a 1929 Soviet film by Sergei Eisenstein
General line of merchandise
General line (military)